Kidney International is a monthly peer-reviewed medical journal covering all aspects of nephrology. It was established in 1972 and is published by Elsevier on behalf of the International Society of Nephrology, of which it is the official journal.

Abstracting and indexing
The journal is abstracted and indexed in:

According to the Journal Citation Reports, the journal has a 2021 impact factor of 18.998.

References

External links

Nephrology journals
English-language journals
Elsevier academic journals
Academic journals associated with learned and professional societies